Elizabeth Bonner may refer to:

 Beth Bonner (1952–1998), American long-distance runner
 Elizabeth Anne Bonner (1924–1981), author of Western fiction and poetry